Maximilian Edwin Hoffman (12 November 1904 in Vienna, Austria – 9 August 1981), was an Austrian-born, New York-based importer of luxury European automobiles into the United States during the 1950s.

Known equally for his acumen and influence, Hoffman was instrumental in development and refinement of several iconic luxury sports cars, including the Mercedes-Benz 300SL Gullwing, Porsche 356 Speedster, and V-8 powered BMW 507 roadster.

Hoffman's contributions to both automobile development and sports car racing earned him induction into the Automotive Hall of Fame in 2003.  Both his home in Rye, New York, and Park Avenue Jaguar showroom in Manhattan were designed by famed architect Frank Lloyd Wright.

Career
Hoffman's dealers made requests through him, both for existing models and new types they thought their customers would purchase in the booming post-war American market. The most famous result of Hoffman's suggestions is the Mercedes-Benz 300SL "gullwing".  More than 80% of the 300SL's total production of approximately 1400 units were sold in the US, making it the first Mercedes-Benz widely successful outside its home market and thoroughly validating Hoffman's seat-of-the-pants prediction. Its success is credited with changing the company's image in America from a manufacturer of solid but staid luxury automobiles to one capable of rendering high-performance sports cars.

From 1950 until 1953, Hoffmann was the importer and distributor for Volkswagen for the eastern United States. He was also the importer and sole distributor for BMW from the mid-sixties until selling his business to BMW of North America in 1975. Alfa Romeo was also imported to the United States by Hoffman starting from the mid-1950s. The Giulietta Spider was born by request of Hoffman. In 1961 Alfa Romeo started importing cars to the United States.

The Porsche 356 1955 "Speedster" was the result of a Hoffman suggestion that a less expensive, racier version of the standard 356 would sell well in America. With its low, raked windshield—which easily could be removed for weekend racing, bucket seats, and a minimal, folding top, it was an instant hit.

Some of the dealers, such as Lake Underwood and his team's machine engineer, Dick DeBiasse, were especially influential on Hoffman.

Personal
The Max Hoffman House was designed and furnished by Frank Lloyd Wright a few years after Hoffman had commissioned Wright to design and build his Jaguar Hoffman Auto Showroom at 430 Park Avenue in Manhattan. 

In 1982 Marion O. Hoffman established the non-profit Maximilian E. and Marion O. Hoffman Foundation Inc. in West Hartford, Connecticut, in memory of her husband. The organization donates to groups, mostly in Connecticut, that further education, medicine and the arts. In 2013 the foundation had assets of approximately $60 million.

Hoffman, who had Jewish ancestry  was an auto racer in Europe before immigrating to the United States to avoid the Nazis
.

See also 
Lake Underwood
Ferrari America
BMW 507

References

External links
 Automobile / US-Markt: Aufreißer für Europa, Der Spiegel, 9 September 1968, p. 124.
 Donald Osborne: Max Hoffman Made Imports Less Foreign to Americans, New York Times, 18 March 2007
 Visionär und Autohändler, stern, 26 September 2014.
 Christof Vieweg: Er brachte deutsche Techniker zum Tanzen'', Süddeutsche Zeitung, 24 March 2007

1904 births
1981 deaths
People in the automobile industry
Businesspeople from Vienna
20th-century American businesspeople
American people of Austrian-Jewish descent
Austrian Jews
Jewish emigrants from Nazi Germany to the United States